This article details the qualifying phase for wrestling at the 2020 Summer Olympics . The competition at these Games comprised a total of 289 athletes coming from the different nations; each had been allowed to enter a maximum of 18 (1 per event).

Two places had been reserved for the host nation, Japan. Each NOC could only send one wrestler per weight class.

Quota places are allocated to the respective NOC and not to competitor that achieved the place in the qualification event.

Timeline

Qualification summary

Men's freestyle events

57 kg

65 kg

74 kg

86 kg

97 kg

125 kg

Men's Greco-Roman events

60 kg

67 kg

77 kg

87 kg

97 kg

130 kg

Women's freestyle events

50 kg

53 kg

57 kg

62 kg

68 kg

76 kg

Notes

References

External links
United World Wrestling

Qualification
2020